The Luxembourg men's national under-18 ice hockey team is the men's national under-18 ice hockey team of Luxembourg. The team is controlled by the Luxembourg Ice Hockey Federation, a member of the International Ice Hockey Federation. The team represents Luxembourg at the IIHF World U18 Championships.

International competitions

IIHF European U18 Championships

1998: 8th in Group D

IIHF World U18 Championships

1999: 5th in Division II Europe
2000: 8th in Division II Europe
2019: 4th in Division III B
2022: 2th in Division III B (Promotion to Division III A)

External links
Luxembourg at IIHF.com

under-18
National under-18 ice hockey teams
Men's sport in Luxembourg
Youth sport in Luxembourg